Clint Nicholas Baltazar Geronimo is a Filipino politician who currently serves as a councilor of Navotas from the 2nd district since 2022, a position he previously from 2007 to 2013. He previously served as the Vice Mayor of Navotas from 2013 to 2022. He is also a former chairman of Navotas's SK Federation and the former National Vice Chairman of SK Federation of the Philippines.

References

Mayors of Navotas
Filipino city and municipal councilors